Dumistan (Arabic: دمستان) and (Persian: دمستان) is a coastal village situated on the western shore of Bahrain. It is situated to the north of Karzakan and west of Hamad Town, in the Northern Governorate administrative region of the country.

References

Populated places in the Northern Governorate, Bahrain